Hagger as a surname may refer to:

Kim Hagger, British athlete, born 1961
Lloyd Hagger, Australian rules footballer, born 1898
Nicholas Hagger, British poet and author, born 1939
Peter Hagger, British trade unionist, born 1944 and died 1995
Rubeus Hagrid, a character in the fictional Harry Potter universe, is referred to this way by his half-brother Grawp

See also
Hagar (disambiguation)
Haggar (disambiguation)
Hager